SG Holland may refer to:

 Sidney George Holland (1893–1961), 25th Prime Minister of New Zealand 
 Sydney George Holland, 2nd Viscount Knutsford, (1855–1931), British barrister and peer